Susanne Leutenegger Oberholzer (born 6 March 1948 in Chur, Grisons) is a politician of the Social Democratic Party of Switzerland. She was a National Councillor from 1987 to 1991, then again from 1999 to 2018.

Life and career
After she earned a licenciate degree in economics from the University of Basel, she worked as an economist and an economic journalist. She later resumed her law studies and subsequently worked in the central secretary office of a labour union. In 1999, she earned the lawyer diploma in Basel, where she has been working since 2002.

Leutenegger Oberholzer was first involved in politics within the Progressive Organizations of Switzerland which she represented in the Grand Council of Basel-Stadt from 1983 to 1989 and in the National Council from 1987 to 1991. She joined the Social Democratic Party in 1993 and served as a Socialist National Councillor from 1999 until she resigned in 2018. She was replaced by fellow Socialist Samira Marti from 10 December 2018.

See also
List of members of the Federal Assembly from the Canton of Basel-Landschaft
List of members of the National Council of Switzerland, 2011–15
List of members of the National Council of Switzerland, 2007–11
List of members of the National Council of Switzerland, 2003–07

References

External links

Official website 

20th-century Swiss women politicians
20th-century Swiss politicians
21st-century Swiss women politicians
21st-century Swiss politicians
20th-century Swiss women
21st-century Swiss women
Social Democratic Party of Switzerland politicians
Women members of the National Council (Switzerland)
Politics of Basel-Stadt
1948 births
People from Chur
Living people